Leptodrassex is a genus of ground spiders that was first described by J. Murphy in 2007.

Species
 it contains five species:
Leptodrassex algericus (Dalmas, 1919) – Algeria, Libya
Leptodrassex capensis Haddad & Booysen, 2022 – South Africa
Leptodrassex hylaestomachi (Berland, 1934) – Canary Is.
Leptodrassex murphyi Haddad & Booysen, 2022 – Mozambique, South Africa
Leptodrassex simoni (Dalmas, 1919) (type) – Portugal, Spain, France, Lebanon

References

Araneomorphae genera
Gnaphosidae
Spiders of Africa
Spiders of Asia